Bortnick is a surname, being an Americanized form of the Ukrainian Jewish and Polish surname Bortnik, which originated as an occupational name for a beekeeper. Notable people with the surname include:

Avi Bortnick (born 1963), American guitarist
Ethan Bortnick (born 2000), American pianist, singer, songwriter, record producer, and musician

See also
Bartnick